SBA may refer to:

Computing
 Search-based application
 Space-based architecture
 Simple Bus Architecture, an architecture for the SoC implementation based in VHDL
 sba, sparse bundle adjustment software

Healthcare
 Skilled birth attendant, a health care practitioner in childbirth care

Organizations and institutions
 SBA Communications, communications structures company in America
 Sergeants Benevolent Association of NYPD
 Singapore Badminton Association
 Small Business Administration
 Sport Boys Association, a Peruvian football (soccer) club
 Saint Benedict at Auburndale, a Catholic school in Cordova, Tennessee
 State Board of Administration of Florida
 Student bar association
 Steam Boat Association of Great Britain

Transportation
 Brewster SBA, naval attack aircraft
 SBA Airlines
 Santa Barbara Airport, FAA airport identifier code SBA
 Santa Barbara station, Amtrak station code SBA

Other uses
 Susan B. Anthony, American political activist
 School-based assessment, component of Hong Kong Diploma of Secondary Education
 Short backfire antenna
 Simulation Based Acquisition
 Single Best Answer, style of examination questions typically used in medical education
 Small Business Act for Europe
 Sovereign Base Areas
 Soybean agglutinin, a soybean lectin antinutrient
 Sports Broadcasting Act of 1961, a U.S. federal law
 Structure-based assignment
 Swachh Bharat Abhiyan, the "Clean India Mission" which began in 2014